Samuel Henry Miller (April 19, 1840 – September 4, 1918) was a Republican member of the U.S. House of Representatives from Pennsylvania for two terms from 1881 to 1885.

Biography
Samuel H. Miller was born at Coolspring, Pennsylvania (near Mercer).   He graduated from Westminster College in New Wilmington, Pennsylvania, in 1860.  He taught school.  During the American Civil War he served in the Fifty-fifth Regiment of the Pennsylvania Militia.  He edited and published the Mercer Dispatch from 1861 to 1870.  He studied law, was admitted to the bar and commenced practice in Mercer in 1871.

Miller was elected as a Republican to the Forty-seventh and Forty-eighth Congresses (1881-1885).  He declined to be a candidate for renomination in 1884.  He resumed the practice of law in Mercer, and served as president judge of the several courts of Mercer County, Pennsylvania, from 1894 to 1904.

He was again elected to the Sixty-fourth Congress (1915-1917).  He declined to be a candidate for renomination in 1916.  He died in Mercer, with interment in Mercer Cemetery.

Sources

The Political Graveyard

1840 births
1918 deaths
Pennsylvania lawyers
Westminster College (Pennsylvania) alumni
People from Mercer County, Pennsylvania
Republican Party members of the United States House of Representatives from Pennsylvania
19th-century American politicians
19th-century American lawyers